The 1983 Campeonato Paulista da Primeira Divisão de Futebol Profissional da Série A1 was the 82nd season of São Paulo's top professional football league. Corinthians won the championship by the 19th time. São José was relegated.

Championship
The twenty teams of the championship were divided into four groups of five teams, with each team playing twice against all other teams, and the two best teams of each group passing to the Second phase, and the team with the fewest points out of all the twenty being relegated.

In the second phase, the eight remaining teams would be divided into two groups of four, each team playing twice against the teams of its own group and the two best teams of each group qualifying to the Semifinals.

First phase

Group A

Group B

Group C

Group D

Second phase

Group E

Group F

Semifinals

|}

Finals

|}

References

Campeonato Paulista seasons
Paulista